Tony Barrett (born Martin Lefkowitz; May 24, 1916 – November 16, 1974) was an American actor, writer, and producer.  He was born on May 24, 1916 New York City. He worked as a radio and screen actor, screenwriter, and television writer and producer.

Personal life
He was married to writer Steffi Barrett. He died of cancer in Los Angeles on November 16, 1974.

References

External links

 

1916 births
1974 deaths
Male actors from New York City
Deaths from cancer in California